Rajahmundry City Assembly constituency is a constituency in East Godavari district of Andhra Pradesh, representing the state legislative assembly in India. It is one of the seven assembly segments of Rajahmundry Lok Sabha constituency, along with Anaparthy, Rajanagaram, Rajahmundry Rural, Kovvur, Nidadavole, and Gopalapuram. Adireddy Bhavani is the present MLA of the constituency, who won the 2019 Andhra Pradesh Legislative Assembly election from Telugu Desam Party. , there are a total of 253,087 electors in the constituency.

Mandals 

The mandal and wards that form the assembly constituency are:

Members of Legislative Assembly

Election results

Assembly elections 1952

Assembly Elections 2009

Assembly elections 2014

Assembly Elections 2019

See also 
 List of constituencies of the Andhra Pradesh Legislative Assembly

References 

Assembly constituencies of Andhra Pradesh